Charlaine is a given name.  Notable people with this name include the following:

Charlaine Harris (born 1951), American author
Charlaine Edith Karalus, birthname of Janet Pilgrim (model) (1934 – 2017), American model
Charlaine Woodard, birthname of Charlayne Woodard (born 1953), American playwright and actress

See also

Charline (name)
Charmaine (disambiguation)
Charlayne